The Temple of Apollo ( Apollonion) is one of the most important ancient Greek monuments on Ortygia, in front of the Piazza Pancali in Syracuse, Sicily, Italy.

History 
Dating to the 6th century B.C., this temple is one of the most ancient Doric temples in Sicily, and among the first with the layout consisting of a peripteros of stone columns. This layout became standard for Greek temples. The temple underwent several transformations: closed during the persecution of pagans in the late Roman Empire, it was a Byzantine church, from which period the front steps and traces of a central door are preserved, and then an Islamic mosque during the Emirate of Sicily. After the Norman defeat of the Saracens, it was reconsecrated at the Church of the Saviour, which was then incorporated into a 16th-century Spanish barracks and into private houses, though some architectural elements remained visible. For instance, in 1778, Dominique Vivant Denon described the temple:  These successive renovations severely damaged the building, which were rediscovered around 1890 inside the barracks and was brought to light in its entirety thanks to the efficient excavations of Paolo Orsi.

Description 

The temple's stylobate measures 55.36 x 21.47 metres, with its very squat columns in a 6 x 17 arrangement. It represents the moment of transition in the Greek west between temples with a wooden structure and those built completely out of stone, with a hexastyle front and a continuous colonnade around the perimeter which surrounds the pronaos and a naos divided into three aisles by two internal colonnades of more slender columns, which supported a wooden roof, which is difficult to reconstruct. At the back of the naos was a closed space, typical of Sicelian temples, called an adyton.

The construction of a building with forty-two monolithic columns, probably transported by sea, must have seemed incredible to its builders, as demonstrated by the unusual inscription on the top step on the eastern face dedicated to Apollo, in which the builder (or the architect) celebrates the construction of the building with an emphasis on the pioneering character of the construction.

The remains permit the reconstruction of the original appearance of the temple, which belongs to the proto-doric period and shows uncertainties in construction and style, such as the extreme closeness of the columns on the sides, the variation of the intercolumniation, the lack of concern for the correspondence of the triglyphs with the columns and archaic aspects the very elongated floor plan. The architrave was unusually high and lightened at the back by an L-shaped cross section.

Some aspects are very experimental, such as the importance given to the eastern face with a double colonnade, wider separation of the central columns and more generally a pursuit of emphasis rather than proportional harmony. The pioneering building was a defining step in the emergence of the peripteral Doric temple in Sicily, representing a sort of local prototype which juxtaposed aspects developed in mainland Greece with an unusual height which was imitated only in Magna Graeca, as well as the presence of the adyton, which was probably the location of the sacred image and formed the centre of the whole building.

Terracotta from the structure is preserved in the Museo Archeologico Regionale Paolo Orsi in Syracuse, along with fragments of the gutter and of the akroteria, and some roof tiles, probably among the first produced in Sicily.

Gallery

See also 
List of Ancient Greek temples
Ancient Greek temple

Notes

Bibliography 

Mertens, Dieter; Schutzenberger, Margareta. Città e monumenti dei Greci d'Occidente: dalla colonizzazione alla crisi di fine V secolo a.C.. Roma L'Erma di Bretschneider, 2006. .
Lippolis, Enzo; Rocco, Giorgio; Livadiotti, Monica. Architettura greca : storia e monumenti del mondo della polis dalle origini al V secolo. Milano B. Mondadori, 2007.  .
Vecco, Marilena. L' evoluzione del concetto di patrimonio culturale, Milano F. Angeli, 2007. .

External links 

The Temple of Apollo on galleriaRomana 

6th-century BC religious buildings and structures
Apollo
Syracuse
Ancient Syracuse
Archaeological sites in Siracusa